The Sir Richard Steele is a public house in Haverstock Hill, north London, midway between Belsize Park and Chalk Farm tube stations on the Northern line. It is named after Richard Steele (1672 – 1729). It has been designated as an asset of community value.

References

External links

The Sir Richard Steele.

Pubs in the London Borough of Camden
Assets of community value
Belsize Park